Casomai (also known as If by Chance) is a 2002 Italian romantic comedy film written and directed by Alessandro D'Alatri.

Cast 

Fabio Volo: Tommaso
Stefania Rocca: Stefania
Gennaro Nunziante: Don Livio 
Mino Manni: Rino 
Maurizio Scattorin: Fausto
Andrea Jonasson: Christel
Sara D'Amario: Laura

References

External links

2002 films
Italian romantic comedy films
2002 romantic comedy films
Films directed by Alessandro D'Alatri
2000s Italian films